This is a list of settlements in Sibiu County, Romania.

The following are the county's cities and towns, along with their attached villages: 

The following are the county's communes, with component villages: